This article contains links to lists of notable Christian music artists, organized by music genre.

Note: Because classifying music by genre can be arbitrary, these groupings are generalized and many artists appear on multiple lists.

List of Christian country artists
List of Christian hardcore bands
List of Christian hip hop artists
List of Christian metal artists
List of Christian rock bands
List of Christian punk bands
List of Christian ska bands
List of Christian vocal artists
List of Christian worship music artists
List of gospel musicians

Lists of musicians by genre
Genre